The Bibliothèque municipale de Nancy (est. 1750) is a public library in Nancy, France. It houses approximately 400,000 documents, books, maps, plans and prints. Polish king Stanisław Leszczyński began the collection in 1750. The library is located in a 1769 building of the historical University of Nancy. At 43, rue Stanislas, it is close to the Place Stanislas and the Gare de Nancy-Ville.

See also
 Books in France

References

External links

 Official site
 Europeana. Items related to BM de Nancy, various dates
.
 
 

Buildings and structures in Nancy, France
Nancy
Libraries established in 1750